Edward Bennett (September 25, 1915 – February 9, 1997) was an American rower. He competed in the men's coxed four at the 1936 Summer Olympics.  He graduated from Harvard College.

References

1915 births
1997 deaths
American male rowers
Olympic rowers of the United States
Rowers at the 1936 Summer Olympics
People from Melrose, Massachusetts
Sportspeople from Middlesex County, Massachusetts
Harvard Crimson rowers